

Introduction
Solving a structure means determining the unknown internal forces, reactions and displacements of the structure. When a structure can be solved by using the equations of static equilibrium alone, it is known as determinate structure. A structure can be termed as indeterminate structure if it can not be solved by using the equations of equilibrium alone. Some examples of indeterminate structures are fixed-fixed beam, continuous beam, propped cantilever etc.

Methods for Solving
To solve an indeterminate structure it is necessary to satisfy equilibrium, compatibility and force-displacement requirements of the structure. The additional equations required to solve indeterminate structure are obtained by the conditions of compatibility and/or force-displacement relations. The number of additional equations required to solve an indeterminate structure is known as degree of indeterminacy. Based on the types of unknown, a structure can be termed as statically indeterminate or kinematically indeterminate.

The following methods are used to solve indeterminate structures:
 Flexibility method
 Slope deflection method
 Moment distribution method
 Direct stiffness method
 Relative Deformation co-efficient method

See also
Statically indeterminate
Static equilibrium

References

Structural analysis
2.An Innovative Method For Analysis Of Indeterminate Structures: Relative Deformation Coefficient Method For Statically Indeterminate Structures